Harpole is a village  west of Northampton, England, along the A4500 road (formerly the A45) about  east of the M1 Motorway junction 16.

The village's name means "filthy pool".

Governance
Harpole is in the unitary authority area of West Northamptonshire. Prior to local government reform in 2021 it was in the district council area of South Northamptonshire where it was part of Harpole and Grange ward, together with the parishes of Milton Malsor, Kislingbury, Rothersthorpe and Gayton. It was also in the area of Northamptonshire County Council and is in the Parliamentary Constituency of Daventry. The MP is currently Chris Heaton-Harris (Conservative).

Geography and history

A Roman mosaic floor uncovered in 1846-48 identifies the site of a Roman villa north of the village. 

In April 2022 archaeologists found an Anglo-Saxon woman's grave, the Harpole bed burial, at a site in Harpole being developed for housing by Vistry. The discovery was announced in December 2022 and described as "the most significant early medieval female burial ever discovered in Britain".

Demographics
2001 census data shows 1,547 people resident in the Parish Council area consisting of 755 males and 792 females (the 2009 estimated population is 1,557), in 636 households, of which 82.6% were owner occupied or being purchased with a mortgage.

Facilities
It hosts two public houses:The Live and Let Live, located on Larkhall Lane; and the Turnpike or Beefeater, located at the Harpole Turn from the A4500 road (former A45 road).

Village events
Harpole hosts a scarecrow weekend in September, during which thousands of visitors enjoy the views of the historic village. There is also an event in December where Santa drives around the village, as in, following him.

Harpole bed burial

An early Christian Anglo-Saxon era burial site of a woman of high social standing was found in Harpole in spring 2022.

References

External links

Harpole Parish Council Website

Villages in Northamptonshire
West Northamptonshire District
Civil parishes in Northamptonshire